Kirill Kapustin (Кирилл Капустин ; born February 8, 1993) is a Russian professional ice hockey player. He is currently playing with Traktor Chelyabinsk of the Kontinental Hockey League (KHL).

Playing career
Kapustin made his Kontinental Hockey League (KHL) debut playing with Lokomotiv Yaroslavl during the 2013–14 KHL season. On August 15, 2016, Kapustin ended his tenure with Lokomotiv as he was traded for compensation to fellow KHL team, Amur Khabarovsk.

On May 16, 2017, Kapustin was returned to Lokomotiv by Amur in a trade alongside Alexander Yelesin in exchange for Danil Romantsev.

After two seasons with Severstal Cherepovets, Kapustin left as a free agent and was signed to a two-year contract with his sixth KHL club, Traktor Chelyabinsk, on 6 May 2021.

References

External links

1993 births
Living people
Amur Khabarovsk players
HC Lada Togliatti players
Lokomotiv Yaroslavl players
Russian ice hockey forwards
Severstal Cherepovets players
HC Sochi players
Sportspeople from Yaroslavl
Traktor Chelyabinsk players